Methodist Jennie Edmundson Hospital is one of four major facilities comprising the Nebraska Methodist Health System. The hospital is located at 933 E. Pierce Street in Council Bluffs, Iowa.

Established in 1886, Jennie Edmundson Hospital became a Methodist Health System affiliate in 1994. It boasts a 230-bed regional health care center serving southwestern Iowa.

The Council Bluffs hospital employs a workforce of 464 full-time and nearly 250 part-time employees, and has an active medical staff of 132 physicians.

Methodist Jennie Edmundson Hospital offers a 24-hour Level III Emergency Department that treated approximately 22,000 patient visits last year. The hospital had a total of 5,101 admissions. Its physicians performed 1,718 inpatient and 6,361 outpatient surgeries.

It is the only hospital with the capability to perform emergency angioplasty procedures, and that offers nationally accredited cancer and breast cancer programs in the region, with southwest Iowa's only Advanced Wound Center.

Jennie has a 20-bed inpatient adult behavior health unit with ECT services. Methodist Jennie Edmundson Hospital offers a full-line of Women's services including a birthing center with LDRP rooms and a Level II nursery where 360 babies were delivered in 2012.

Methodist Jennie Edmundson Hospital is a member of VHA and recently completed an $18 million renovation and construction project that netted the hospital nearly 31,000 square feet of new space for the intensive care unit and surgical suite.

See also 
 Hospitals in Omaha
 Nebraska Methodist Health System
 Methodist Women's Hospital (Elkhorn, Nebraska)
 Methodist Hospital (Omaha, Nebraska)

References

External links 
 Methodist Jennie Edmundson Hospital

Organizations based in Omaha, Nebraska
Hospitals in Iowa